The "Marcha de Zacatecas" is a Mexican patriotic song that serves as the regional anthem of the Mexican state of Zacatecas.

History

In 1891, in a family gathering at the home of Fernando Villalpando, there was a bet between Villapando and Genaro Codina, which consisted of writing a military march. The winner would dedicate the song to the then Governor of the State of Zacatecas, General Jesús Aréchiga.

That same year, both the Codina and the Villalpando compositions were submitted to a jury composed of friends and relatives, who gave the victory to the song of Genaro Codina. The original title was "Marcha Aréchiga", to be dedicated to the governor Arechiga, but he suggested that the name was changed to March of Zacatecas.

The song was premiered in the Hidalgo garden, in the city of Zacatecas, for a serenade of the Municipal Band, directed by Fernando Villalpando, which has the merit of the music; that is where the song earned the title of "Himno Regional de Zacatecas".

Via "Zacatecas March" Codina influenced many other compositions, including "Washington and Lee Swing" (q.v.).

Lyrics 
Complete version:.

References

Zacatecas
1892 songs